Loxosceles speluncarum is a species of venomous recluse spider in the family Sicariidae. It is native to South Africa. It resides in caves, and is distinct from the species L. spinulosa. This species of recluse spider features a black violin shape on its back. Specimens in captivity from the Lebata district bear distinct black markings down the dorsal length of their abdomen. Due to the distance between habitats where this species of spider is found, the influence of the mechanism of gene flow is unknown.

References 

Spiders of South Africa
Sicariidae
Spiders described in 1835